Majrilan (also Romanized as Majrīlān; also known as Majrūlān) is a village in Dasht-e Zahab Rural District, in the Central District of Sarpol-e Zahab County, Kermanshah Province, Iran. At the 2006 census, its population was 116, in 26 families.

References 

Populated places in Sarpol-e Zahab County